Michel Picard (December 4, 1934 – March 13, 1999) was a French sprint canoer who competed in the early 1960s. He finished eighth in the C-2 1000 m event at the 1960 Summer Olympics in Rome. Picard was scheduled to compete in the C-1 1000 m event at those same games, but withdrew prior to the heats.

References

Michel Picard's profile at Sports Reference.com

1934 births
1999 deaths
Canoeists at the 1960 Summer Olympics
French male canoeists
Olympic canoeists of France